Stephen Gaghan (born May 6, 1965) is an American screenwriter and director. He is noted for writing the screenplay for Steven Soderbergh's film Traffic, based on a Channel 4 series, for which he won the Academy Award for Best Adapted Screenplay, as well as Syriana which he wrote and directed. He also wrote and directed the thriller Abandon and the family film Dolittle, and directed the drama Gold.

Childhood and education
Gaghan was born in Louisville, Kentucky, the son of the former Elizabeth Jane Whorton and her first husband, Stephen Gaghan (d. 1980), and a stepson of Tom Haag. Gaghan attended Kentucky Country Day School, a college preparatory school in Louisville. He was an All-State soccer player where he held the assist record at the school for nearly three decades. He is a grandson of Jerry Gaghan, a newspaper columnist and drama critic for Variety and the Philadelphia Daily News. Gaghan wrote in a 2001 article in Newsweek, "I also wanted to be a writer, like my grandfather, who carried a card in his wallet that read, "If you find me, call my son [my father] at this number..."

In his final days of high school before graduation, Gaghan was expelled for driving a go-cart through the halls of the school. During the release of Traffic, a critic commented on one of the teen characters in the movie who is a drug addict and a straight-A student, calling it unrealistic, which Gaghan defended by stating that he had straight A's while he was addicted to drugs and alcohol. As Gaghan wrote in an article published in Newsweek in February 2001, "I wasn't much different from my peers, except where they could stop drinking after three or six or 10 drinks, I couldn't stop and wouldn't stop until I had progressed through marijuana, cocaine, heroin and, finally, crack and freebase--which seem for so many people to be the last stop on the elevator." Gaghan has stated that he began dealing with his addictions in 1997. "Over one long, five-day weekend, I had three separate heroin dealers get arrested," he said. "My dealer, my backup dealer and my backup-backup dealer. I was left alone, and I just hit that place, that total incomprehensible demoralization. That was the end of it; up five days straight, locked in the bathroom, convinced there was nowhere else to go, I had to kill myself, I'm going to kill myself. I just couldn't take another minute of it."

He attended the University of Kentucky and was a member of Delta Tau Delta fraternity. He was a student on the Fall 1986 Voyage of the "Semester at Sea" Study Abroad Program where he attended classes on board the SS Universe and sailed around the world. He eventually graduated from Babson College in 1988 with a degree in screenwriting. He also started a catalog company, Fallen Empire Inc., which he hoped would support his writing career.

Career

Gaghan wrote the screenplay for Traffic, for which he won an Academy Award for Best Adapted Screenplay in 2000. In addition to Traffic, Gaghan also directed and wrote the screenplays for Syriana (2005) and Abandon (2002), the former receiving comparable critical acclaim to Traffic, while the latter turned out to be a total fiasco. Other writing credits include Rules of Engagement (2000), Havoc (2005), and The Alamo (2004), as well as a handful of episodes of various television series. Gaghan turned down the chance to adapt Dan Brown's novel, The Da Vinci Code.

In his television writing career, he won an Emmy Award for co-writing a NYPD Blue episode entitled Where's Swaldo, in 1997.  In addition to NYPD Blue, he has also written for The Practice and New York Undercover.

His next project is a film adaptation of Malcolm Gladwell's book, Blink: The Power of Thinking Without Thinking. He has also been hired by Warner Bros. to write the screenplay of the Dead Spy Running franchise written by author Jon Stock. He is also set to direct crime thriller Candy Store.

On January 19, 2017, it was announced that Ubisoft had hired Gaghan to direct the film adaptation of the popular video game The Division, but it was announced later that Gaghan was no longer attached to the project.

Personal life
Gaghan has a son, Gardner, (b. 1999) and a daughter, Elizabeth, who goes by the nickname of Betsy, (b. 2001) from a previous relationship with actress Michael McCraine, whom he met in 1997 while at a recovery meeting. On May 19, 2007, Gaghan married Marion "Minnie" Mortimer. Together they have a daughter, Tuesday, (b. February 2, 2009), and a son, Johnny (b. May 20, 2014).

Filmography

Film

Uncredited revisions
 I Still Know What You Did Last Summer (1998)
 Black Hawk Down (2001)
 Phone Booth (2002)
 After Earth (2013)

Television

Acting roles

Video games
Call of Duty: Ghosts (2013)

Personal appearances
 Entourage
 The Henry Rollins Show
 Film '72
 Sunday Morning Shootout
 The Charlie Rose Show
 The Big Story
 HBO First Look
 Hollywood High (2003)
 73rd Academy Awards
 Inside Traffic: The Making of Traffic

References

External links

 Stephen Gaghan interview on Charlie Rose

1965 births
Living people
Mortimer family of New York
American television writers
American male screenwriters
Babson College alumni
Best Adapted Screenplay Academy Award winners
Best Adapted Screenplay BAFTA Award winners
Primetime Emmy Award winners
Edgar Award winners
Writers from Louisville, Kentucky
Writers Guild of America Award winners
American mystery writers
Best Screenplay Golden Globe winners
English-language film directors
American male novelists
American male television writers
Novelists from Kentucky
Film directors from Kentucky